Loanny Gerardo Cartaya Prieto (born November 12, 1985 in Havana) is a Cuban football player who played for Real Maryland Monarchs in the USL Second Division.

Club career
He played for local sides Industriales, before returning to former youth team Ciudad de la Habana. He scored his first National League goal on 24 September 2005 against provincial rivals FC La Habana.

Cartaya defected to the United States from Cuba just after his team's Olympic qualifying game against the United States on March 11, 2008, along with several teammates, including Yendry Diaz. Cartaya apparently slipped out of his hotel in the middle of the night and traveled by car to West Palm Beach.

After several unsuccessful trials with various Major League Soccer clubs, Cartaya signed with the Real Maryland Monarchs in the USL Second Division on April 15, 2009.

International career
Cartaya has two caps for the senior Cuba national football team, both in friendlies against Guyana in February 2008.

References

External links
 
Real Maryland Monarchs bio

1985 births
Living people
Sportspeople from Havana
Defecting Cuban footballers
Association football midfielders
Cuban footballers
FC Industriales players
FC Ciudad de La Habana players
Real Maryland F.C. players
USL Second Division players
Cuban expatriate footballers
Cuban expatriate sportspeople in the United States
Expatriate soccer players in the United States
Cuba international footballers